Fort Smith Region was a former Statistics Canada census division, one of two in the Northwest Territories, Canada. It was abolished in the 2011 census, along with the other census division of Inuvik Region, and the land area of the Northwest Territories was divided into new census divisions named Region 1, Region 2, Region 3, Region 4, Region 5, Region 6.

Its former territory covered all of the modern-day Regions 3 through 6, as well as a part of Region 2.  For example, its border with the old Inuvik Region ran through the middle of Great Bear Lake, which is now entirely within the modern-day Region 2.

It contained more than 77 percent of the population and more than 54 percent of the land area of the Northwest Territories. Its main economic centre was the territorial capital of Yellowknife; it also contained the town of Fort Smith.

Communities
City
Yellowknife
Towns
Fort Smith
Hay River
Village
Fort Simpson
Hamlets
Fort Liard
Fort Providence
Behchokǫ̀
Whatì
Settlements
Dettah
Enterprise
Fort Resolution
Jean Marie River
Kakisa
Łutselk'e
Nahanni Butte
Gamèti
Fort Reliance
Trout Lake
Wekweeti
Wrigley
Indian reserves
Hay River Reserve (Hay River Dene)
Salt River First Nation

References

Regions of the Northwest Territories
Census divisions of the Canadian territories